= George Appert =

French painter

George Appert (1850–1934) was a French painter.

== Selected paintings ==
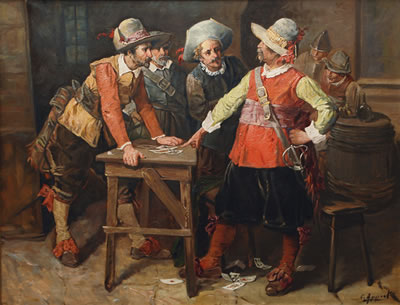

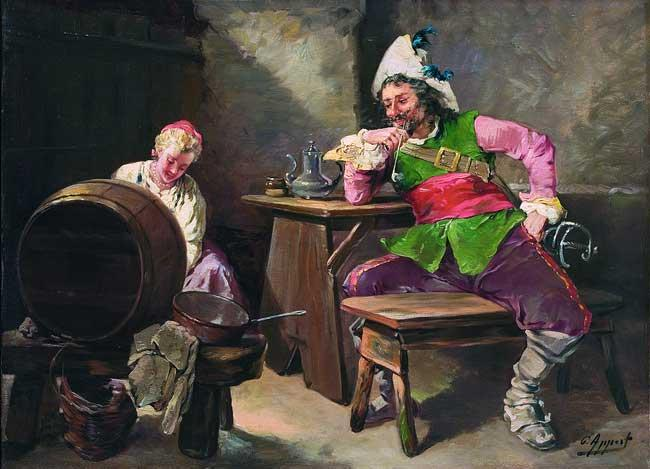

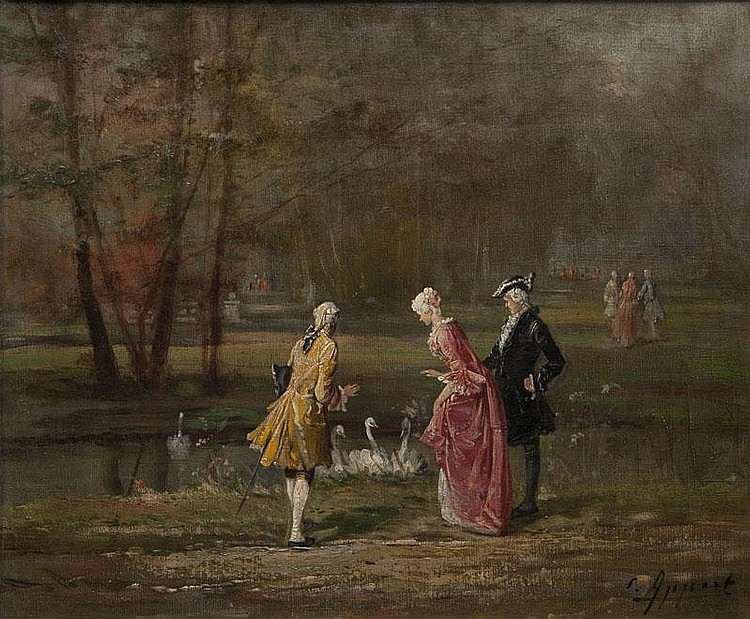

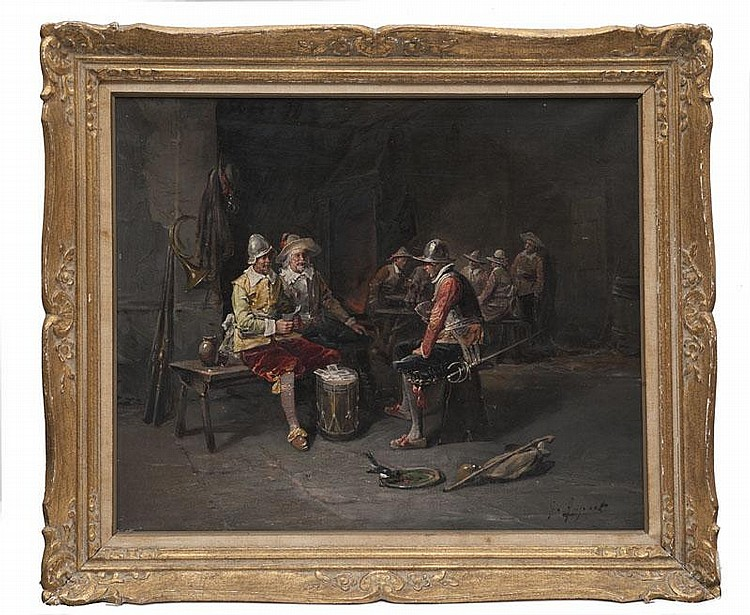

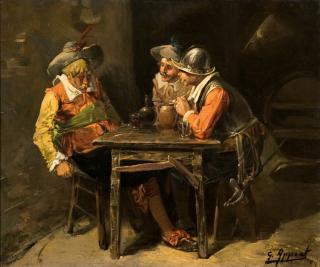
